The Mayor of Portland is the official head of the city of Portland, Maine, United States, as stipulated in the Charter of the City of Portland. This article is a listing of past (and present) Mayors of Portland.

History of the office
Before 1923, the city's leader was known as the Mayor. From 1923 to 1969, the position was named "Chairman of the City Council." In 1969, the "Mayor" title was reinstated, but the office continued to be held by the leader of the city council, chosen by a vote of its members.

In 2011, the city returned to the practice of popularly electing a mayor for the first time since 1923. Subsequent elections were held in 2015 and 2019.

Mayors of Portland
This is a list of mayors of Portland, Maine. This information is obtained from the website of the city council.

References

Portland, Maine